The 1973 Ball State Cardinals football team was an American football team that represented Ball State University as an independent during the 1973 NCAA Division I football season. In its third season under head coach Dave McClain, the team compiled a 5–5–1 record. The team played its home games at Ball State Stadium in Muncie, Indiana.

Schedule

References

|Ball State
Ball State Cardinals football seasons
Ball State Cardinals football